John Delany or John Delaney (1769–1838) was an Irish luthier and maker of violins from Dublin. His instruments have become known for their unusual labels, often expressing his nationalist ideologies for liberty and equality. Two of Delany's violins are preserved as part of a collection in the National Museum of Ireland, Dublin.

Early life

Delany was born in 1769. While he spent most of his adult life living and working in Dublin, it has been proposed that Delany's family may have originally been landowners in County Laois, like many other Irish luthier families, such as the Molineuxs, Wards, Perrys and Wilkinsons. There is evidence of Delanys residing in Tinnakill, a rural area near Raheen, County Laois, where the Perry family owned substantial quantities of land. This could explain the connection to Thomas Perry of Dublin, to whom Delany later apprenticed. Tinnakill is also linked to the Parnell family, who became known for their efforts to bring about emancipation in Ireland. In particular, a Malachy Delany of Tinnakill is recorded as being an agent to Sir John Parnell in 1773. In the 1817 and 1818 Wilson's Dublin Directory, a Malachy Delany is also listed as working as a "Ladies' Shoe-maker" in the building next door to John Delany's on Great Britain Street, which coincidentally was later renamed Parnell Street. It is uncertain whether these are the same person but it is possible that there is a connection between them or their families. Unsurprisingly, John Delany was himself a staunch Republican and supporter of Irish revolutionary, Wolfe Tone, something he would later express through his work as a luthier.

Career

Apprenticeship and early career: 1795–1814
Delany's career as a luthier started relatively late in life. He began his apprenticeship with Thomas Perry at 6 Anglesea Street, Dublin around 1795, making him about 26 years of age. While old for an apprentice, Delany was already an competent cabinet maker and was said to be a "true artist in wood work". During his apprenticeship to Perry, Delany adopted many traits typical of the Perry school at that time. In particular, Delany's instruments were based on the Amati model, which Perry is said to have studied directly from an Amati instrument lent to him by the Duke of Leinster. Delany would typically brand his violins at the back below the button 'DELANY/DUBLIN', another signature of the Perry school. In 1799, Italian luthier, Vincenzo Panormo, came to Dublin and spent a few years working for Perry during the latter part of Delany's tenure. It is possible that Delany was influenced by Panormo's style, which was also of the Amati school.

Following his apprenticeship to Perry, Delany set up his own workshop in the centre of Dublin city, where he made and sold his instruments as well as music books. One of his earlier violins, dated 1799, is labelled as being made at 11 Townsend Street, Dublin, but it is uncertain whether he was still working as an apprentice to Perry at this location, or whether had already set up his own workshop by then. By 1802, Delany was working independently on the North side of Dublin city at 17 Great Britain Street (now Parnell Street), where he remained until about 1810 before moving to 18 Great Britain Street. Around this time, Delany published a music book for the German flute, titled The compleat tutor for the German flute containing the best and easiest instructions for learners to obtain a proficiency. This was a reproduction of an earlier publication by John Simpson in 1746 which included Italian, English and Scotch tunes. Delany's publication also included Irish tunes.

Partnership and later career: 1814–1838
By 1814, Delany had moved his business to 31 Great Britain Street, where he would remain for the rest of his working life. During his lifetime, Delany established his reputation as a competent violin maker. According to Rev. William Meredith Morris, who published the book British Violin Makers, Delany's instruments were "well made" and produced a "clear and sweet tone". Delany was described by Rev. Father Greaven, an expert on 18th and 19th century Irish violin makers, as "a fine maker and a very erratic genius". 

In 1821, Delany entered into a partnership with his nephew, Cornelius Gannon. Gannon was from a craftsmen family of carpenters, many of whom would go on to work in the famous Guinness Brewery. Gannon's great-grandson, Cathal Gannon, would later become a renowned Irish harpsichord maker and fortepiano restorer. Delany later took on an apprentice named Daniel Compton. Delany died in 1838, at which time Compton was successor to the business and continued to operate out of 31 Great Britain Street.

Labels

Delany's instruments have become known for their unusual variety of labels, some of which are short, others long and expressive. His short labels typically follow the standard format of maker, place and year, for example: 'Made by John Delany, No.17 Britain Street, Dublin, 1808'. Delany's longer labels, on the other hand, express his strong sense of nationalism, typical of young Irishmen of the time. This was undoubtedly strengthened by the growing republican movement in 18th-century Ireland that culminated in the 1798 Rebellion, as well as potentially having family ties to the Parnells. An example of one of his long labels, written the year after the 1798 Rebellion, reads:

Another example of one of his long labels, commonly quoted in books, reads:

Legacy

Delany's unusually expressive labels have led to much interest and intrigue amongst historians and violin enthusiasts. As a result, his labels have been featured in some of the earliest books on violin making and its makers, including The History of The Violin, and Other Instruments Played on with the Bow from the Remotest Times to the Present, The Violin: Its Famous Makers and their Imitators, A Dictionary of Violin Makers, and British Violin Makers

Delany also featured in a book by Matthew Doyle called Beneath the Eagle’s Wings. The book tells the story of a widower, Liam O'Callaghan, who is a violinist and purveyor of Irish traditional music. O'Callaghan is the owner of an old Delany violin that he inherited from his father. The instrument is described as being "plain in its nature and based on the Amati model". The book also describes one of Delany's characteristically long labels, similar to the second label above. It then goes on to describe O'Callaghan's fascination with Delany and his message:

Sometimes Liam sat with the instrument in his hands and glided his fingers over the inscription, tracing the letters with his index finger. As the first part of the inscription was almost certainly a call by the maker to be remembered after his death, Liam often wondered if Delany would be pleased to hear the music that he and his father had played by his creation.

Liam had also always loved the second message on the instrument and as a young boy had made an enquiry with his father as to why the maker had placed an inscription expressing such implicit sentiments on the back of the violin [...] It was inconceivable, his father had told him, that Delany could not have been aware of the ending of the Atlantic slave trade the previous year by the British Government and the brutal continuance of the institution of slavery that still existed in the maker’s world.

His father considered this second message to be a considerate and thoughtful effort at solidarity with those held in bondage, as well as an explicit protest against the policies of both the American Government domestically, and the British Government in their colonies.

Extant instruments

It is unknown hoe many instruments Delany produced in his lifetime. Some of them still survive today and occasionally come up for sale or auction, others are housed as part of collections or exhibits. Two of Delany's violins are preserved in the National Museum of Ireland as part of a collection of musical instruments by Irish makers. However, these instruments do not reflect his best work, being Stainer-like in style and unpurfled with a dull brown varnish. The collection at the National Museum of Ireland also includes instruments by other 18th and 19th century luthiers including Delany's teacher, Thomas Perry, as well as John Mackintosh, Thomas Molineux and George Ward.

Some of Delany's extant instruments:

 (?): National Museum of Ireland, Dublin
 (?): National Museum of Ireland, Dublin

Publications

 The compleat tutor for the German flute containing the best and easiest instructions for learners to obtain a proficiency [microform] : to which is added a choice collection of the most celebrated Italian, English, Irish and Scotch tunes curiously adapted to that instrument. Also a dictionary explaining such words as generally occur in music. Dublin: J. Delany, 1810.

See also
Thomas Molineux (Irish luthier)
John Mackintosh (Irish luthier)
Thomas Perry (Irish luthier)
George Ward (Irish luthier)

References

Citations

Bibliography

External links

 John Delany on Dublin Music Trade
 John Delany on Brian Boydell Card Index
 John Delany on Brompton's
 John Delaney on Brompton's
 Catalogue of Delany's 1810 publication at National Library of Australia

1769 births
1838 deaths
18th-century Irish businesspeople
19th-century Irish businesspeople
18th-century Irish people
19th-century Irish people
Bowed string instrument makers
Businesspeople from County Dublin
Irish luthiers
Irish musical instrument makers